Yujiulü Wuti (pinyin: Yùjiǔlǘ Wútí) was a ruler of the Rouran (July, 429 – September, 444) with the title of Qilian or Chilian Khagan (敕連可汗). He was the son of Yujiulü Datan.

Reign 
In 432, Northern Wei captured 20 Rouran warriors at the border, but Emperor Taiwu pardoned them. Impressed Wuti sent him tributes for this. Later in 435, Wuti was married to Princess Xihai (西海公主) a cousin or sister of Emperor Taiwu and gave his sister as a concubine of Taiwu. She was accompanied by brother Wuti's brother Yujiulü Tulugui (郁久閭秃鹿傀) who presented the emperor 2,000 horses. In 436–437, Wuti unexpectedly violated the peace and attacked the border. Taiwu responded by declaring war on the Rouran. But the campaign ended soon since Wei had no more provisions, and they did not seize the Rouran cattles. 

He was involved in Wei war against Northern Liang in 439. Situation was a result of the Northern Wei messengers to the Xiyu kingdoms, who were going through Northern Liang frequently, were alleging that Juqu Mujian had informed Xiyu kingdoms that they should not submit to Northern Wei and should submit to Rouran instead.  At the encouragement of the prime minister Cui Hao, Emperor Taiwu again prepared military action. With Yuan He, the son of Southern Liang's last prince Tufa Rutan, as guide, he launched a speedy attack and arrived at Guzang quickly. Juqu Mujian, in shock, refused to surrender, defending the city against a siege, while seeking immediate military assistance from Wuti. Yujiulü Wuti did launch a surprise attack on Pingcheng to try to force Emperor Taiwu to give up the campaign, but after initial successes, he failed to capture Pingcheng, and his brother Yujiulü Qiliegui (郁久閭乞列歸) was captured by Northern Wei forces. About 10000 Rouran soldiers were slaughtered.

In fall 443, while attacking Rouran, Emperor Taiwu suddenly encountered Wuti, and Crown Prince Huang, who was with him, advised an immediate attack, but Emperor Taiwu hesitated, allowing Wuti to escape. 

In 444, Taiwu began a new attack to Rouran. Wuti was defeated and fled. He later died and was succeeded by Yujiulü Tuhezhen.

Family 
He was married to Princess Xihai (西海公主) a cousin or sister of Emperor Taiwu in 434. His sister was also married to Taiwu, becoming mother of Tuoba Yu.

In popular media 

 He was portrayed by He Jianze (何建澤) in Chinese TV Series "The Story of Mulan" (花木兰传奇)

References 
 History of the Northern Dynasties, vol. 86.
Book of Wei, vol. 103

 

5th-century monarchs in Asia
Khagans of the Rouran